Santa Maria Maddalena is a church in Rome.

Santa Maria Maddalena may also refer to:

Churches in Italy
 Santa Maria Maddalena, Bologna, Emilia-Romagna
 Santa Maria Maddalena (Castiglione d'Orcia), Tuscany
 Santa Maria Maddalena, Cento, Emilia-Romagna
 Santa Maria Maddalena, Esanatoglia, Marche
 Santa Maria Maddalena, Gradoli, Latium
 Santa Maria Maddalena, Matelica, Marche
 Santa Maria Maddalena, Lodi, Lombardy
 Santa Maria Maddalena, Pievebovigliana, Marche
 Santa Maria Maddalena, Ravenna, Emilia-Romagna
 Santa Maria Maddalena, Urbania, Marche
 La Maddalena, Venice, Veneto

See also
Santa Maria Madalena (disambiguation)
Mary Magdalene
Santa María Magdalena de Pazzi
Santa Maria Maddalena dei Pazzi